National Highway 64 (NH 64) is a  National Highway in India connecting Dandi and Ahmedabad in the Indian state of Gujarat.

References

National highways in India
National Highways in Gujarat
Transport in Ahmedabad